Ronald Butler Sr., MBE (August 17, 1937 – November 19, 2017) was a famous Bahamian calypso and rake n scrape entertainer and singer. Butler is referred to as "The Godfather of Bahamian Music" and his career spans more than five decades.

Butler began his career in music at the age of 16. He performed in Bahamian local nights spots such as Ronnie's Rebel Room, the Rum Key, Big Bamboo, the Trade Winds Lounge, and Nassau Beach Hotel and has toured throughout Europe, South America and North America. Among his popular hits are songs "Burma Road", "Crow Calypso" and "Age Ain't Nothin' But A Number".  He achieved great success and career longevity.

Most recently his single, "Married Man", was featured in Tyler Perry's "Why Did I Get Married Too?", which was shot in The Bahamas.

Butler's achievements were recognised in 2003 when he was made a Member of the Order of the British Empire (MBE).

Family
He is the father of actor Ron Butler Jr.

Death
Ronnie Butler died on November 19, 2017 from cancer. He was 80 years old.

References

1937 births
2017 deaths
Bahamian singers
Place of birth missing
Members of the Order of the British Empire